Hahncappsia straminea is a moth in the family Crambidae. It is found in Mexico.

The wingspan is about 32 mm for males and 27–31 mm for females.

References

Moths described in 1913
Pyraustinae